Peter T. George (June 29, 1929 – July 27, 2021) was an American weightlifter and Olympic and World champion. He was later an assistant professor of stomatology. Because of his ethnic origin, and despite the long list of Bulgarian weightlifters with Olympic medals, he was the first Bulgarian to win Olympic gold.

Biography
His Bulgarian parents Trayan and Paraskeva Taleff originated from Bitola, from where they immigrated to the U.S. in 1929. His father was an activist of the Macedonian Patriotic Organization and both his parents were members of the Macedono-Bulgarian St. Elia the Prophet Orthodox Church (Akron, Ohio).

Born in Akron, Ohio, George was the first 15-year-old to clean and jerk 300 lbs and was the youngest senior state champion of Ohio at 14 and 1/2. His brother Jim is also weightlifter. Pete won a gold medal at the 1952 Summer Olympics in Helsinki. George also received silver medals at the 1948 Summer Olympics in London, and at the 1956 Summer Olympics in Melbourne. He also won five World Championships outside of the Olympics in 1947, 1951, 1953, 1954, and 1955. George placed second at the World Championships in 1949 and 1950, making a total of ten medals in World and Olympic competition. He also set four world records, three in the clean and jerk, and one in the total.

After retiring from athletics, he attended Kent State University, the Ohio State University, and Columbia University. George became an orthodontist and served on the faculty of the University of Hawaii. He pioneered treatments for obstructive sleep apnea. He held the patent for the Nocturnal Airway Patency Appliance (NAPA), a device preventing the stoppage of breathing during sleep. After retirement, George used to spend summertime in the birthplace of his wife, Ognyanovo, Blagoevgrad Province, Bulgaria. He is also described sometimes as a Macedonian American, and thus in 1993 George was awarded the Macedonian Hall of Fame Award by the Macedonian Businessmen's Club in Akron, Ohio.

Notes

References

External links

1929 births
2021 deaths
Sportspeople from Akron, Ohio
American male weightlifters
Weightlifters at the 1948 Summer Olympics
Weightlifters at the 1952 Summer Olympics
Weightlifters at the 1956 Summer Olympics
Olympic gold medalists for the United States in weightlifting
Olympic silver medalists for the United States in weightlifting
American people of Bulgarian descent
Pan American Games gold medalists for the United States
Medalists at the 1956 Summer Olympics
Medalists at the 1952 Summer Olympics
Medalists at the 1948 Summer Olympics
Pan American Games medalists in weightlifting
People associated with physical culture
American dentists
Macedonian Bulgarians
20th-century American inventors
Weightlifters at the 1951 Pan American Games
Medalists at the 1951 Pan American Games
American people of Macedonian descent